Edward Blount (18 July 1769 – 20 March 1843) was a British politician, and activist in the cause of civil rights for Roman Catholics. He was a Whig Member of Parliament for Steyning, Sussex from 1830 till the constituency was abolished in 1832.

References

Oxford Dictionary of National Biography, Blount, Edward (1769–1843), campaigner for Roman Catholic civil rights by H. J. Spencer.

External links
 

1769 births
1843 deaths
Members of the Parliament of the United Kingdom for English constituencies
UK MPs 1830–1831
UK MPs 1831–1832
Whig (British political party) MPs for English constituencies